German submarine U-191 was a Type IXC/40 U-boat of Nazi Germany's Kriegsmarine built for service during World War II.

She was ordered on 4 November 1940 from DeSchiMAG AG Weser Bremen, laid down on 2 November 1941, and launched on 3 July 1942. She was commissioned under Kapitänleutnant Helmut Fiehn on 20 October 1942 and underwent crew training and work-ups until 31 March 1943.

Design
German Type IXC/40 submarines were slightly larger than the original Type IXCs. U-191 had a displacement of  when at the surface and  while submerged. She had two shafts and two  propellers.

U-191 was fitted with six  torpedo tubes (four fitted at the bow and two at the stern), 22 torpedoes, one  SK C/32 naval gun, 180 rounds, and a  SK C/30 as well as a  C/30 anti-aircraft gun. The boat had a complement of forty-eight.

Service history
U-191 took part in several wolfpack operations in the North Atlantic. On 21 April 1943, she achieved her only success, torpedoing and sinking the 3,025 GRT Norwegian merchant ship Scebli, killing two of Sceblis crew.

Summary of raiding history

References

Bibliography

External links

Ships built in Bremen (state)
German Type IX submarines
U-boats commissioned in 1942
U-boats sunk by depth charges
U-boats sunk by British warships
U-boats sunk in 1943
World War II shipwrecks in the Atlantic Ocean
World War II submarines of Germany
1942 ships
Ships lost with all hands
Maritime incidents in April 1943